Mollweide Glacier is a steep glacier  south of Mount Kowalczyk, descending west from Hobbs Ridge into Blue Glacier, in Victoria Land, Antarctica. The name is one of a group in the area associated with surveying applied in 1993 by the New Zealand Geographic Board; this glacier was named from the Mollweide projection, an equal area map projection with the parallels and central meridian being straight lines.

References

Glaciers of Victoria Land
Scott Coast